The battle of Bulair took place on 8 February 1913 (O.S. 26 January 1913) between the Bulgarian Seventh Rila Infantry Division under General Georgi Todorov and the Ottoman 27th Infantry Division. The result was a Bulgarian victory.

Origins 

The strong Ottoman fortress Edirne was blocked by the Bulgarian army since the beginning of the war in 1912. From the middle of January 1913 the Ottoman high command prepared an attack towards Edirne to break through the blockade.

The battle 

The advance began in the morning of 8 February (O.S. 26 January) when the Myuretebi Division headed under the cover of fog from the Saor Bay toward the road to Bulair. The attack was uncovered at only 100 steps from the Bulgarian positions. In 7 o'clock the Ottoman artillery opened fire. The Bulgarian auxiliary artillery also opened fire, as did the soldiers of the 13th Infantry Regiment, and the enemy advance was slowed.

From 8 o'clock advanced the Ottoman 27th Infantry Division which concentrated on the shore-line of the Sea of Marmara. Due to their superiority the Ottomans seized the position at the Doganarslan Chiflik and began to surround the left wing of the 22nd Infantry Regiment. The command of the Seventh Rila Infantry Division reacted immediately and ordered a counter-attack of the 13th Rila Infantry Regiment, which forced the Myuretebi Division to pull back.

The Ottoman forces were surprised by the decisive actions of the Bulgarians and when they saw the advancing 22nd Thracian Infantry Regiment they panicked. The Bulgarian artillery now concentrated its fire on Doganarslan Chiflik. Around 15 o'clock 22nd Regiment counter-attacked the right wing of the Ottoman forces and after a short but fierce fight the enemy began to retreat. Many of the fleeing Ottoman troops were killed by the accurate fire of the Bulgarian artillery. After that the whole Bulgarian army attacked and defeated the Ottoman left wing.

Around 17 o'clock the Ottoman forces renewed the attack and headed towards the Bulgarian center but were repulsed and suffered heavy casualties.

The position was cleared of Ottoman forces and the defensive line was reorganized. In the battle of Bulair the Ottoman forces lost almost half of their manpower and left all their equipment on the battlefield.

References 
 Пейчев, А. и др. 1300 години на стража, София, 1984, Военно издателство
 Марков, Г. България в Балканския съюз срещу Османската империя, 1912–1913 г., София, 1989, Издателство “Наука и изкуство”
 Колектив, История на Българите: Военна история, София, 2007, Труд, 
 Косев, К., Подвигът, София, 1983, Военно издателство

Footnotes 

Battles of the First Balkan War
Battle of Bulair
Bulair
Bulair
History of the Gallipoli Peninsula
Adrianople vilayet
History of Çanakkale Province
1913 in the Ottoman Empire
January 1913 events
Battles of Mustafa Kemal Atatürk